The 2002 UCI Women's Road World Cup was the fifth edition of the UCI Women's Road World Cup. It consisted of nine rounds; compared to 2001, the Liberty Classic and Trophée International were replaced by the GP Castilla y León and the GP de Plouay. German rider Petra Rossner won the series overall.

Races

Final classification

External links

2002 in women's road cycling
UCI Women's Road World Cup